The 2018 Gran Premio Bruno Beghelli was the 23rd edition of the Gran Premio Bruno Beghelli road cycling one day race. It was held on 7 October 2018 as part of UCI Europe Tour in category 1.HC.

Teams
Twenty-four teams of up to seven riders started the race:

Result

References

2018 UCI Europe Tour
2018 in Italian sport
Gran Premio Bruno Beghelli